Alessandro Grandoni (born 27 July 1977) is an Italian football coach and a former defender. He is the head coach of Serie D club Chieti.

Club career
Born in Terni, Italy, Grandoni started his career with hometown club Ternana, then joining Lazio in 1995, and making his Serie A debut one year later. Since then he played at Serie A and Serie B level with a number of teams, including Sampdoria, Torino, Modena, Livorno and Gallipoli. In 2010, he agreed to join Greek Superleague club Olympiakos Volos, but he successively left the club a few days later by mutual consent.

International career
Grandoni was also part of the Italy Olympic team that won the Gold medal at the 1997 Mediterranean Games football tournament; he also took part at the 2000 Summer Olympics.

Coaching career
After retiring as a player, Grandoni started a career as a coach. He served as youth coach of ACF Fiorentina (Giovanissimi Nazionali) between 2014 and 2016, and successively as youth coach of the Primavera team of Pisa.

In November 2017 he accepted an offer as head coach of Tuscan Serie D club Scandicci, which he led to avoid relegation by the end of the season. He subsequently joined another Serie D club, Savona, in June 2018. He left Savona at the end of the 2018–19 season.

On 17 July 2019, he joined Serie D club Chieti.

References

External links
 
 
 FIGC 

1977 births
Living people
People from Terni
Footballers from Umbria
Association football defenders
Italian footballers
Italian football managers
Torino F.C. players
U.C. Sampdoria players
S.S. Lazio players
U.S. Livorno 1915 players
Serie A players
Serie B players
Olympic footballers of Italy
Footballers at the 2000 Summer Olympics
Italy under-21 international footballers
Ternana Calcio players
Modena F.C. players
A.S.D. Gallipoli Football 1909 players
Mediterranean Games gold medalists for Italy
Mediterranean Games medalists in football
Competitors at the 1997 Mediterranean Games
Sportspeople from the Province of Terni